D. baileyi may refer to:

Dendropsophus baileyi, a species of frog
Duplicaria baileyi, a species of sea snail

See also
Baileyi (disambiguation)